South African War Memorial or Boer War Memorial, may refer to:

Australia
Anning Monument, Tingalpa, Brisbane, Queensland
Boer War Memorial, Allora, Toowoomba Region, Queensland
Boer War Memorial, Gatton, Lockyer Valley Region, Queensland
Boer War Veterans Memorial Kiosk and Lissner Park, Charters Towers, Queensland
Coronation Lamp War Memorial, Mount Morgan, Rockhampton Region, Queensland
South African War Memorial, Brisbane, Queensland
South African War Memorial (South Australia)

Canada
South African War Memorial (Halifax)
South African War Memorial (Toronto)
Boer War Memorial (Montreal)
South African War Memorial (Ottawa), see Canadian war memorials

Ireland
Fusiliers' Arch, Dublin

South Africa
Anglo-Boer War Memorial (Johannesburg)

United Kingdom
South African War Memorial, Cardiff
Boer War Memorial, Crewe, also known as the South African War Memorial
South African War Memorial, Richmond Cemetery, London
The Last Shot/South African War Memorial, Manchester - see List of public art in Greater Manchester
Boer War Memorial, Winsford, Cheshire
Second Boer War Memorial, York

See also

 Boer War (disambiguation)